Re Vancouver Sun is a leading Supreme Court of Canada case regarding the open court principle, freedom of the press and publication bans.  The open court principle is the "right of public access to the courts",

Facts

Section 83.28 Orders and Investigative Hearings
Section 83.28 operates with respect to investigations of terrorism offences.  The section allows police to apply for a court order to compel a potential witness to:

 attend an investigative hearing;
 submit to questioning by police at the hearing;
 to bring all documents and other materials in their possession to the hearing

The questioning of the witness occurs before a judge.

Section 83.28 also allows for the exclusion of the public and media from the hearing.

Investigation of Air India Bombing
In 1985, two acts of terrorism caused the deaths of two baggage handlers in Japan and the 329 passengers and crew of Air India Flight 182.  The Air India bombing was the largest mass murder in Canadian history.

In 2004, two accused were on trial for conspiracy to murder and other offences relating to those events.  

As part of the investigation, the Crown obtained a court order requiring a potential Crown witness, a "Named Person", to attend a judicial investigative hearing for examination.  The order was made pursuant to section 83.28 of the Criminal Code.

The investigative hearing was to be held in camera, meaning that the hearing would not be open to the public or press.

Legal Challenge
A reporter from the Vancouver Sun newspaper became aware of the investigative hearing when she recognized lawyers from the Air India terrorist attack and attempted to follow them as they entered a closed courtroom.  The reporter was barred from the courtroom and in response the newspaper filed a legal challenge for (1) access to material filed in the court proceedings and (2) a declaration that no court proceedings should be held in private. 

The application was opposed on the basis that the confidentiality was necessary to preserve the integrity of the investigation and to prevent mischief in the Sikh community against the witness.

Lower Court Decision

The Supreme Court of British Columbia published a Synopsis of Reasons for Judgment which described the general nature and the outcome of the proceedings.  The court ruled that the synopsis was sufficient public disclosure.

The appeal of the BC Supreme Court decision was made directly to the Supreme Court of Canada.  The British Columbia Court of Appeal did not hear the appeal.

Decision
The Supreme Court of Canada ordered that:

The Court, citing paragraph 83.28(5)(e), also ordered the investigative judge to "review the continuing need for any secrecy at the end of the investigative hearing and release publicly any part of the information gathered at the hearing that can be made public without unduly jeopardizing the interests of the Named Person, of third parties, or of the investigation".

Reasoning
The majority of the Court, represented by Iacobucci and Arbour JJ. felt strongly that 

The court noted "[e]ven in cases where the very existence of an investigative hearing would have been the subject of a sealing order, the investigative judge should put in place, at the end of the hearing, a mechanism whereby its existence, and as much as possible of its content, should be publicly released."

Dissent

In their reasons for dissent, Justices Bastarache and Deschamps noted that public access to investigative hearings would normally defeat the purpose of the proceedings by rendering them ineffective as an investigative tool.

See also
 Open court principle

References

Canadian freedom of expression case law
Supreme Court of Canada cases
2004 in Canadian case law
Publication bans in Canadian case law